La Tercena is a municipality in Catamarca Province in northwestern Argentina, located within the Greater San Fernando del Valle de Catamarca area.

References

Populated places in Catamarca Province